Zilla School refers to a number of old secondary schools in Bengal (now in Bangladesh and India) established during the British Raj.

In Bangladesh

In India